Miguel Ángel Basualdo (born 2 July 1979) is an Argentine former footballer.

He played for Chilean clubs Coquimbo Unido, Deportes Iquique, in Argentina for General Paz Juniors and Luján de Cuyo, for Italian clubs Bassano Romano, Colleferro Calcio and Anziolavino and Vietnam club Huda Hue FC.

External links
 

1979 births
Living people
Argentine footballers
Argentine expatriate footballers
General Paz Juniors footballers
Lota Schwager footballers
Coquimbo Unido footballers
Deportes Iquique footballers
Primera B de Chile players
Chilean Primera División players
Expatriate footballers in Chile
Expatriate footballers in Italy
Association football midfielders